Tharrhypas (Greek: Θαρύπας, 430 - 392 BC) was a king of the Molossians and the great-great- grandfather of Alexander the Great.

He is mentioned by Thucydides as a minor in 429 BC. 

He was the father of Alcetas I, and is said to have been the first to introduce southern Greek (namely Attic) cultural traits among Molossians.

References

Rulers of Ancient Epirus
5th-century BC Greek people
5th-century BC rulers